Hannah v. Commonwealth, 153 Va. 863, 149 S.E. 419 (1929) is a Supreme Court of Virginia case that is often cited for distinguishing the "heat of passion" from malice as the motive in a crime. The formulation is: 

'Malice aforethought' implies a mind under the sway of reason, whereas 'passion' whilst is does not imply a dethronement of reason, yet it is the furor brevis, which renders a man deaf to the voice of reason so that, although the act was intentional to death, it was not the result of malignity of heart, but imputable to human infirmity. Passion and malice are, therefore, inconsistent motive powers, and hence an act which proceeds from the one, cannot also proceed from the other.

References

External links
Hannah v. Commonwealth, 153 Va. 863, 149 S.E. 419 (1929)

1929 in United States case law
U.S. state criminal case law
Virginia state case law